Juan de Castilla (1460–1510) was a Roman Catholic prelate who served as Bishop of Salamanca (1498–1510) and Bishop of Astorga (1494–1498).

Biography
Juan de Castilla was born in Palencia, Spain in 1460. In 1494, he was appointed during the papacy of Pope Alexander VI as Bishop of Astorga. In 1498, he was appointed during the papacy of Pope Alexander VI as Bishop of Salamanca. He served as Bishop of Salamanca until his death in 1510. While bishop, he was the principal co-consecrator of Pascual Rebenga de Ampudia, Bishop of Burgos (1497).

See also
Catholic Church in Spain

References

External links and additional sources
 (for Chronology of Bishops) 
 (for Chronology of Bishops) 
 
 
 
 

15th-century Roman Catholic bishops in Castile
16th-century Roman Catholic bishops in Spain
Bishops appointed by Pope Alexander VI
1460 births
1510 deaths